Melvin Morella Boothman (October 16, 1846 – March 5, 1904) was a U.S. Representative from Ohio.

Born near Bryan, Ohio, Boothman attended the public schools.
He engaged in agricultural pursuits.
Enlisted in Company H, Thirty-eighth Regiment, Ohio Volunteer Infantry, January 4, 1864.
He served through the Atlanta campaign.
He was graduated from the law department of the University of Michigan at Ann Arbor in 1871.
He was admitted to the bar and commenced practice in Bryan, Ohio.

Boothman was elected treasurer of Williams County in 1871 and reelected in 1873.

Boothman was elected as a Republican to the Fiftieth and Fifty-first Congresses (March 4, 1887 – March 3, 1891).
He was not a candidate for renomination in 1890.
He resumed the practice of law in Bryan, Ohio, and died there March 5, 1904.
He was interred in Fountain City Cemetery.

Sources

External links

1846 births
1904 deaths
Republican Party members of the United States House of Representatives from Ohio
People from Bryan, Ohio
People of Ohio in the American Civil War
Union Army soldiers
University of Michigan Law School alumni
Ohio lawyers
19th-century American politicians